Garons is a commune in the Gard department in southern France.

The Nîmes-Alès-Camargue-Cévennes Airport, also called "Garons Airport" is located very close to Garons, on the territory of the commune of Saint-Gilles.

Population

See also
 Costières de Nîmes AOC
Communes of the Gard department

References

External links

 The Regordane Way or St Gilles Trail, which passes through Garons.

Communes of Gard